In linguistics, the postessive case (abbreviated ) is a noun case that indicates position behind something.

This case is found in Northeast Caucasian languages like Lezgian and Agul. In Lezgian the suffix -хъ (-qh), when added to the ergative-case noun, marks the postessive case. This case is now rarely used for its original meaning "behind" and is often used to mean "with" or "in exchange for".

References

Grammatical cases